Ernest Nash (September 14, 1898, in Potsdam, Germany – May 18, 1974 in Rome, Italy) was a student of Roman architecture and pioneer of archaeological photography.  Nash was born as Ernst Nathan in Potsdam, Germany, but later changed his name to Nash when he was living in the United States between 1939 and 1952.

He was a graduate of the University of Jena and had a law office in his native city of Potsdam, Germany.

Nash first went to Italy on August 30, 1936, with the goal of documenting in photographs the ancient ruins of Rome, Ostia, and Pompeii.  The main reason for fleeing Potsdam was the institution of the racial laws by Adolf Hitler.  He emigrated to the United States in 1939 but returned to Italy in 1952 to continue his work.  He established the Fototeca Unione archive at the American Academy in Rome in 1957 and served as its director.

Besides architectural photography he also produced a series of portraits of famous musicians, including Béla Bartók, while he lived in New York City.  The Bartók photo is still used by The New York Times.

He was survived by Bertha, his third wife, two daughters, two grandchildren, and now two great-grandchildren.  His first two wives have already died. Nash died in Rome in 1974.<ref>[https://www.nytimes.com/1974/05/19/archives/prof-ernest-nash.html "PROF. ERNEST NASH" The New York Times" May 19, 1974]</ref> Nash's tomb is located in Rome's Campo Cestio cemetery. 

WorksRoman towns. Photographs and text by Ernest Nash. (New York: J. J. Augustin, 1944).Pictorial Dictionary of Ancient Rome 2 vol. (1962).

 Literature 
Radnoti-Alföldi, M.; Lahusen, M. C.: Ernest Nash - Ernst Nathan: Potsdam, Rom, New York, Rom'', Nicolai'sche Verlagsbuchhandlung; 2000. In German. .
A Short Biography of Ernest Nash
The Urban Legacy of Ancient Rome: Photographs from the Ernest Nash Fototeca Unione Collection at Stanford University Library

References

External links
Ernest Nash
Archive of the American Academy in Rome

1898 births
1974 deaths
People from Potsdam
German classical scholars
20th-century American photographers
Photographers from Brandenburg
University of Jena alumni
Recipients of the Order of Merit of the Federal Republic of Germany